State Route 663 (SR 663) was an east–west state highway in Washoe County, Nevada serving the Reno-Sparks area. The route was turned over to local control in 2010.

Oddie Boulevard was named after former Republican U.S. Senator Tasker Oddie.

Route description
SR 663 began at the intersection of Sutro Street and Oddie Boulevard in the city of Reno. From there, the highway followed Oddie Boulevard eastward, passing under U.S. Route 395 to enter the city of Sparks. SR 663 ended at the intersection of Oddie Boulevard and Pyramid Way (SR 445).

History
Prior to the renumbering of Nevada state highways in the 1970s, SR 663 was previously known as State Route 32A.

SR 663 was removed from the state highway system on March 16, 2010. However, as of late 2011, the portion of Oddie Boulevard at the US 395 interchange is still maintained by the Nevada Department of Transportation as a frontage road.

Major intersections

References

663